A harness is a looped restraint or support. Specifically, it may refer to one of the following harness types:

 Bondage harness
 Child harness
 Climbing harness
 Dog harness
 Pet harness
 Five-point harness
 Horse harness
 Parrot harness
 Safety harness
 Windsurfing harness
 The backpack straps of a breathing apparatus

Harness may also refer to:
 Cable harness
 Test harness, in software testing
 Harness racing, horse racing
 Loom harness, a component of a loom
 Harness, a type of clinch in grappling
 Harness, Arkansas, a ghost town
 Full harness restraints, see belly chain